Live from Leeds is a live concert DVD by English Folk musician Kate Rusby, released in 2003. The concert was filmed at the Leeds City Varieties.

Track listing
All songs performed by Kate Rusby and/or the Kate Rusby Band

"Fairest of all Yarrow" from Sleepless
"Polly" from Underneath the Stars
"Cruel" from Underneath the Stars
"I Courted a Sailor" from Little Lights
"The Yorkshire Couple" Not on any Kate Rusby albums
"The White Cockade" from Underneath the Stars
"Tunes" The Kate Rusby band only
"The Goodman" from Underneath the Stars
"Who Will Sing Me Lullabies?" from Little Lights
"The Cobbler's Daughter" from Sleepless
"Let Me Be" from Underneath the Stars
"Withered and Died" from Little Lights
"Sir Eglamore" from Hourglass
"Canaan's Land" from Little Lights
"William and Davy" from Little Lights
"Underneath the Stars" from Underneath the Stars

Extras

 Video Diary
 Acoustic Session
 Interviews including Andy Kershaw
 Biographies
 Behind the Scenes Footage
 5.1 Surround Sound Mix

Kate Rusby video albums
2005 video albums
Live video albums
2005 live albums